The Bucovel is a left tributary of the river Teleajen in Romania. It discharges into the Iazul Morilor Teleajen, which is connected to the Teleajen, in Bucov.

References

Rivers of Romania
Rivers of Prahova County